John Patrick Darling Sr. (23 February 1831 – 10 April 1905) was a Scots businessman who developed as a merchant and the largest grain exporter in Australia. He also served as a politician in South Australia in both houses of Parliament.

Born in Edinburgh, as a young married man he emigrated with his family to Australia in 1855, following friends who had traveled there some years before because of the colony's opportunities.

History
John Patrick Darling (23 February 1831 – 10 April 1905) was born in Edinburgh, the second son of John Darling of Duns and his wife, who were a family of modest means. He was educated at George Heriot's School. His father died when he was 10, and the boy was forced to leave school at the age of 11 to help support his family.

His first job was as an office boy at the printing shop of Balfour & Jack, but he lost that job after 6 or 8 weeks. He next worked at Duncan Sinclair and Sons' type foundry, "Whitford House"; then at Alexander Wilson & Son. Lastly he was employed at James Marr, Gallie, & Co., where he worked for about 12 years. He married Isabella Ferguson, and they had two sons, including John Darling Jr.).

Several of his friends, including Alexander Dowie and Joseph Ferguson, emigrated to South Australia in 1851. Over the years there, Dowie built a bootmaking and tannery business, and Ferguson became an owner of The Register in Adelaide.

Realizing the lack of opportunities for advancement in Edinburgh, Darling decided to follow them. He was not a wealthy man, and did not qualify for assisted passage, so it took some time before he could arrange to emigrate with his family.

Business
Early in 1855, he and his family sailed from Leith on the Isabella, landing at Semaphore, South Australia. Four days later he was working in the Berry & Gall store in Rundle Street, Adelaide. Although this job did not last long, he soon found work with baker Robert Birrell of Grenfell street. He worked there for two years.

Darling left to work as a carter and, at the same time, helped his wife set up a store adjacent to the Stag Inn on Rundle Street. They tried again with a shop, "Millbrook Store", on Glen Osmond Road, which slowly became profitable.

His life changed after Darling was recruited by James Smith, of Giles & Smith, Waymouth street, who had a flour mill on West Terrace. While working with Giles & Smith for five years, Darling learned the wheat and flour business. He resigned from the firm and by 1865 was trading independently. In 1867 he took over sole management of the grain stores in Waymouth Street, previously owned by R. G. Bowen. John Darling Jr., began to work with him, and in 1872 was made a partner in the business, thereafter known as J. Darling & Son, millers, grain, and general merchants. For 30 years the business grew steadily. Known as the "Grain King," Darling set up branches throughout South Australia's wheat belt. First he bought up flour mills, then established brokerage agencies in Melbourne in 1880 and London. His company grew to handle most of Australia's export grain.

Darling retired from the business in October 1897, leaving John Darling, Jr as sole proprietor.

Politics
Darling became involved in politics by March 1870. With Patrick "Paddy" Coglin, he was elected for the House of Assembly seat of the West Adelaide district. That parliament lasted little more than a year. Darling did not stand for re-election, choosing instead to travel overseas on business.

But he was re-elected from West Adelaide, serving from 21 June 1876 to 15 April 1878. In 1878 he was returned for the Yatala, but retired in 1880. He did not re-enter Parliament till May 1885, after winning the seat of Stanley.

In May 1887 he was elected as a representative of the Northern District in the Legislative Council. For ten years he continued to be elected to the Upper House. In June 1885, he accepted the portfolio of Commissioner of Public Works in Sir John Downer's Ministry, but he retired from Government in October of the same year.

"He played a useful and an honorable part in the politics of the State, and he was remembered as a prudent, sagacious legislator. He held his opinions strongly, and was not swayed from his convictions by the desire for applause or popularity. ... He knew his mind, and did not waver, doing solid, conscientious work, supporting in particular the interests of the agriculturists, with whose requirements he made himself thoroughly conversant. His sound judgment and the wide knowledge he had gained of South Australia as a leading man of business, earned him the respect and confidence both of his legislative colleagues and the public. It has well been said that though he was not a frequent speaker in Parliament, his utterances' always carried weight. ...  On Select Committees and Royal Commissions he did a great deal of quiet and unostentatious work, which has since benefited the country. The Commission on coal contracts and wharfingering, it may be mentioned, were appointed on his initiative."

Social and religious
Darling was a member of the Adelaide Caledonian Society, and its Chief from 1892 to 1894. He became interested in cricket through his son Joseph (who captained Australia in 21 Test matches), and took a leading part in establishing the Adelaide Oval.

Darling was a deacon of the Hindmarsh Square Congregational Church before joining the Flinders Street Baptist Church in 1865. There he served as Sunday school superintendent, and was an active member, serving as a lay preacher and on committees. He was absent only while living two years in Melbourne, or when overseas on business, as he developed his export business in London. Darling helped found the City Mission Hall in Light Square, towards which he gave £500.

Death
Darling last attended church the day before he died, for the first service of a new pastor, Rev. James Mursell. Darling died of sudden heart failure at the family home "Thurloo" on Kent Terrace, Kent Town. This may have been the residence later known as "Darling House" at 64 Kent Terrace, Kent Town (now 64 Kensington Rd, Norwood).

Family
Darling married Isabella Ferguson, daughter of James and his wife, on 31 December 1850. They had seven sons and one daughter together:
John Darling, Jr. (24 January 1852 – 27 March 1914), married Jessie Dowie, eldest daughter of Darling's friend Alexander Dowie, on 14 October 1875. Darling Jr. became a partner with his father and inherited the family business. (more below)
Robert Darling (died ca. 1933) of Geraldton, Western Australia and Fremantle, Western Australia, accountant and grain dealer. His company was bought out by Frank Green in 1907. He appeared in court in 1911 accused of uttering a worthless cheque to a bookmaker.
Charles Alfred Darling, manager of the firm's London house, became manager of the British New Guinea Development Company. He retired to Tumby Bay, South Australia. A son, Fred B. Darling, was awarded the Military Cross in 1916.
George Darling (ca.1865 – 24 July 1936) of "Thurloo", Middle Brighton, Victoria
James Darling, married Bessie, fifth daughter of his father's friend Alexander Dowie, on 26 October 1882; moved to "Glenarona", Kilmore, Victoria
Frank Darling (died before May 1934), of "Oatlands", Moorooduc, Victoria
Joseph "Joe" Darling (21 November 1870 – 2 January 1946), the International cricketing captain
Isabella Darling, married Henry Ernest Hall, of Williamstown, Victoria.

James Darling (1854–1932), a nephew, was J. Darling & Son's agent in Kadina, South Australia.

References

 

1831 births
1905 deaths
People educated at George Heriot's School
Members of the South Australian House of Assembly
Members of the South Australian Legislative Council
Politicians from Edinburgh
Scottish emigrants to Australia
Australian flour millers and merchants
19th-century Australian businesspeople
19th-century Australian politicians